The 2022 Nevada State Treasurer election took place on November 8, 2022, to elect the Nevada State Treasurer. Incumbent Democratic Treasurer Zach Conine won re-election to a second term.

Democratic primary

Candidates

Declared
Zach Conine, incumbent treasurer

Endorsements

Republican primary

Candidates

Nominee

Eliminated 
Manny Kess, business owner

Endorsements

Polling

Results

Independents and third-party candidates

Candidates

Nominees
Bryan Elliott (Libertarian), business manager
Margaret Hendrickson (Independent American)

General election

Endorsements

Polling

Results

Notes

References

External links
Official campaign websites
Zach Conine (D) for State Treasurer
Michele Fiore (R) for State Treasurer

State Treasurer
Nevada